, also known as The Acme Collection, is an EP by Japanese singer and songwriter Ringo Sheena. Composed of both live and studio recordings, it was released on September 13, 2000 by Toshiba EMI / Virgin Music. The RIAJ certified Ze-Chyou Syuu as a gold certified album for 200,000 copies shipped.

Background
After releasing her debut album Muzai Moratorium in February 1999, she toured the album on her six-date Senkō Ecstasy tour in April 1999, with her band Gyakutai Glykogen. After finishing the tour, Sheena recorded her second album Shōso Strip. After the recording sessions were finished, Sheena embarked on the four date Manabiya Ecstasy tour performed with Tensai Präparat in November, in which Sheena toured university campuses: Tokai University's Shonan Capus in Hiratsuka, Kanagawa, Showa Women's University in Tokyo, Seinan Gakuin University in Fukuoka and Ritsumeikan University in Kyoto.

After the singles "Honnō" (1999), "Gips" (2000) and "Tsumi to Batsu" (2000), Sheena released Shōso Strip on March 31, 2000. It was a great success, being certified for two million copies shipped to stores by the RIAJ. From April to June, Sheena embarked on her 16 date third national tour, Gekokujō Xstasy, starting in Utsunomiya, Tochigi and finishing in Morioka, Iwate. In June and July, Sheena quickly toured again, with a band called Hatsuiku Status. The band performed secret lives and they were not widely publicised.

"So Cold", "Mellow" and "Fukō Jiman" were first performed at November 2, 1999 at Tokai University's Shonan Campus. "Yattsuke Shigoto" and "Gamble" were first performed on April 17, 2000 on the first date of the Gekokujō Xstasy tour. "Onaji Yoru", a song originally appearing on Muzai Moratorium (1999), was first performed on April 1, 1999, on the first date of her Senkō Ecstasy tour in Fukuoka. The Hatsuiku Status songs were all brand new, and had not been performed before their June and July 2000 tour.

Concept 

The box set was created to look like a medicine case. As the set was composed of 8 cm singles, Sheena thought back to the 1980s, the era of 8 cm singles and thought of idol Hiroko Mita, who had appeared on many posters for medical products, acting as if her stomach or head hurt. So for the promotional posters, Sheena stood with her head or stomach in pain, with the Ze-Chyou Syuu case advertised on top, as if it were medicine.

The set is composed of three 8 cm CDs, each featuring a performance from a different band. Disc 1 features performances by Gyakutai Glykogen from Gekokujō Xstasy. Disc 2 is a collection of studio recordings with Tensai Präparat. Sheena intended for these to be live recordings from their Manabiya Tour, but as the sound quality was not what she wanted, she decided to re-record them. Disc 3 contains three songs from the Hatsuiku Status: Gokiritsu Japon tour.

Promotion 

"Yattsuke Shigoto" from given a music video to promote the release. It was shot on the day of the dress rehearsal of the one-night stand live Zazen Ecstasy performed at Kaho Theater of Iizuka-shi, Fukuoka in 2000. All extras playing spectators in the theater were her fans, and they were chosen from her fans who drew a blank in the lottery of the live ticket. The parody of the news report of the various countries in the world at the beginning is used as the introduction part of the music of different arrangement recorded in her third album Kalk Samen Kuri no Hana (2003). In 2006, "Yattsuke Shigoto" was covered by Kera and the Synthesizers on their third album Tonari no Onna.

Track listing

Credits and personnel 
Disc1:  
 Ringo Sheena - vocals, electric guitar: 
 Junji Yayoshi (Sheena’s ex-husband) - electric guitar 
 Seiji Kameda - electric bass guitar 
 Makoto Minagawa (from Thinners, Sparky) - synthesizer, keyboard instrument 
 Masayuki Muraishi - drums

Disc2:  
 Ringo Sheena - vocals, electric guitar 
 Makoto Totani (from Milk Crown, Thinners) - electric guitar
 Eikichi Iwai - electric bass guitar, theremin 
 Hisashi Nishikawa (he is Sheena’s friend and an amateur) - Drums

Disc3:  
 Ringo Sheena - vocals, electric bass guitar
 Junko Murata (from Hachioji Gulliver) - electric bass guitar 
 Hisako Tabuchi (from Number Girl, toddle, Bloodthirsty Butchers)- electric guitar
 Yasunobu Torii (from Panicsmile, Gaji) - electric bass guitar
 Yuka Yoshimura (of Catsuomaticdeath, Metalchicks, ex-DMBQ, ex-Hydro-Guru, ex-OOIOO, ex-Mensu) - Drums

Notes and references 

Ringo Sheena albums
2000 EPs